Transformers Universe may refer to:
 The fictional universe associated with the Transformers franchise
 Transformers Universe (video game), a cancelled massively multiplayer online game
 Transformers Universe (comic book), a number of comic book format series by several publishers